Warren Point County Wildlife Site is a wildlife park owned and managed by the city of Plymouth, Devon, England. Located in an industrial area, northwest of the centre of Plymouth, in the Ernesettle neighbourhood of the city, the  site features, woodland, grassland, salt marsh and views of the River Tamar.

See also
Warrenpoint (disambiguation)

References

Environment of Devon
Geography of Devon